Maxeen is a self-titled pop punk album put out in 2003 by the band Maxeen.

Track listing

 "Please" – 3:45
 "Delete Lola" – 3:20
 "Love Goes A Long Way" – 2:40
 "Strangers" – 2:42
 "Poison June" – 3:20
 "Lead Not Follow" – 4:40
 "Soleil" – 3:38
 "White Flag" – 3:42
 "Shuffle My Feet" – 2:02
 "Take The Weight Off" – 1:40
 "Gettaway" – 2:14
 "Good Enough" - 5:53
 "I Love You"* - 2:44
 "Soleil (Acoustic Version)* - 4:16

   *Bonus Track for Japan Only

References 

2003 albums
Albums produced by Ed Stasium